Julian Quintart (born 24 August 1987) is a Belgian, living and performing in South Korea, as a television personality, record producer, disk jockey, model, actor and singer. He was a cast member in the talk show Non-Summit.

Life and career
Quintart arrived in South Korea, from his home in Aywaille, Belgium, when he was seventeen, as a student with Rotary Youth Exchange. He said that a camera crew was, coincidentally, at the airport when he arrived, and questioned him about being in South Korea. He immersed himself in the culture and learned more of the language. From there, he went on to appear on TV and was able to move into acting. He called it an exciting time, during which he was able to have many experiences that other foreigners could never have, such as going to North Korea, attending a training camp for the South Korean Army, making kimchi the traditional way, and cycling across South Korea. About his learning to speak Korean, in just a few years, he said, "We didn't study Korean to get a high score in school. We just felt the need to communicate clearly with Korean people, which naturally led us to learn the language with great interest."

He has been called a "Jack of all trades". He's been on TV, appearing in SBS Way to Eat Well and Live Well and KBS Star Golden Bell, on dramas, including Sky High, and has performed on Inkigayo. He's been in the movies Papa and My Tutor Friend 2, has held concerts, modeled, been a DJ and music producer. He was a member of the boy band Bonjour in 2006. He has been a DJ in Itaewon, where he started, years ago, with his friend and fellow DJ Yann Cavaille.

In his acting debut, in 2007, on the SBS Friday drama Sky High, he played a supporting role as Daniel, an American who grew up in New York and could speak a little Korean. In an interview with The Korea Times, he said he did not want to make his role a stereotype of foreigners living in Korea. "He (Daniel) is not typical because he can speak some Korean. I think most foreigners' roles in the dramas are like Dennis Oh and Daniel Henney, who seem very cold. But my character shows another image of foreigners, as cute and cheerful." Also, in 2007, he played another supporting role, in the film My Tutor Friend 2.

From July  2014 to June 2015, Julian took part of the Non Summit show. The show features a panel of non-Korean men, living in South Korea, who debate on various topics and "Korean culture, through the eyes of a foreigner", in a talk show format, in the Korean language.

In February 2015, Julian visited his home country and family in Belgium with the TV program "My Friends Home". His mother prepared some dishes for the team.

In September 2014, his musical duo, Yann & Julian, was selected to appear at Global Gathering Korea on 4 October.

On 23 May 2015, as DJ, Julian did the opening of the Kpop Festival: Dream concert 2015 in Seoul World cup stadium 

In January 2016, Julian started a project with the European community Asia, a project to help save the planet in everyday life : LOUD FOR EARTH. He asked people to send videos on how they save energy in their everyday life. This is related to the COP 21 world meeting for climate.

In winter 2016, Julian did some volunteer work. He brought charcoal to some old and poor people with the help of some fans.

Julian participated in the radio program The QUBE with Fabien Yoon. They invited some foreigners living in South Korea and ask them questions about music, history, sports. They also learnt to know about the life of the invited people.

In December 2016, Julian received in Belgium the title of "Ambassadeur du Pays de Liège". The ceremony took place in the chocolate factory of Mr Darcis in Verviers. There is also a chocolate museum in the factory. Julian was represented by his parents and he sent a video explaining his life in South Korea.

In May 2017, Julian did bike in a charity ride,500 km, from Busan to Seoul with a few more people to raise money for the Purme Foundation Nexon Children's Rehabilitation Hospital. The name of this ride is Cycle for Life Korea. A Belgian singer from Ghent, Sioen, did take part of this bike ride.

In July 2017, Julian appeared in a video for the tourist office of Seoul 

In December 2018, Julian became a ambassador for the Hergé exhibitionin the Seoul Arts center Hangaram Design Museum. The exhibition started on 21 December 2018 and ended 1 April 2019. 
This exhibition commemorated the 90th anniversary of Herge's birth.

From December 2018 to January 2019, Julian's mother, Veronique, was invited in the TV Show Samcheondong Grandma. Six grandmothers from different countries lived together in a traditional Korean house, a Hanok, during two weeks. Ana from Hungary, Violeta from Costa Rica, Veronique from Belgium, Mala from Thailand, Odette from Mexico and Laurence from France. Every day, two of them cooked some dishes from their country in a restaurant next to the house where they lived. Julian appeared in one of those TV show. A ceremony was held to celebrate his parents' 40th wedding anniversary. They wore a beautiful Hanbok, the traditional korean outfit.

In March 2019, Their Majesty the King Filip and the Queen Mathilde of Belgium made a state visit to the Republic of South Korea. They led a delegation of over 200 people. Ministers, businessmen. Julian got invited at the Blue House (Cheongwadae) for the official dinner offered by the President Moon Jae-In and his wife Kim Jung-Sook for the King and the Queen.

In May 2019, Julian was on the cover of her mother Cookbook about European recipes. There are also some stories about Julian, his family and some travels from his parents through Europe and a great trip they did through Morocco and Algeria as they planned on crossing the Sahara desert. Julian appeared in some TV and radio shows with his mother and also his father to present the Cookbook. This cookbook is in Korean, edited by Dasanbooks.

From April to June 2019, Julian was on a TV show with the  famous Korean actor Hong Seok-cheon. They tried to revitalize an area of the district of Itaewon. Contacts with some shopkeepers, contacts with the politicians to improve streets lighting, streets decoration. Musical show in the streets.

In March 2020, Julian's nephew, Ulysse, got invited in South Korea with his father, Olivier and 2 of his friends, John John and Olivier to be part of the TV show First Time in Korea from TV channel Mbc every1

In December 2020, 19 foreigners were named Honorary citizen of Seoul. Julian is one of them.

From 2021, Julian has been very concerned in taking actions to save the Planet. Many beach and park cleanings. Conferences with young people to make them understand the small gestures they can do at their level.

January 2022 : JTBC started a new TV show with Julian, Daniel, and some other foreigners living in Seoul. JTBC Talkpawon.
In June Julian visited Barcelona with his family. His parents, his brother Mathieu who lives in Barcelona and his sister Maelle and her son Ulysse. They visited some Gaudi buildings, the Sagrada Familia, and the Güell Park.

Filmography

Television series

Music videos

Film

References

External links

1987 births
Living people
Belgian DJs
Belgian expatriates in South Korea
Belgian male models
Belgian record producers
Belgian television personalities
Belgian male actors
People from Aywaille